Mount Ararat Cemetery is a historic cemetery in Nashville, Tennessee established in 1867 by and for African Americans.

A historical marker commemorates its history. In 1983 it was acquired by Greenwood Cemetery. One of the most notable markers is the grave of the Reverend Nelson Merry, the founding pastor of the First Baptist Church, Capitol Hill, in Nashville.

Notable burials
 William Edmondson sculptor
 Nelson Walker, businessman
 Moses McKissack Ⅲ, architect

References

African-American history of Tennessee
African-American cemeteries in Tennessee